Sacral artery may refer to:

 Lateral sacral artery
 Median sacral artery